The 2014 AFF Beach Soccer Championship, also known as the 2014 AFF FELDA Beach Soccer Championship for sponsorship reasons, was the first beach soccer championship for Southeast Asia, held from 21–31 October 2014, in Kuantan, Pahang, Malaysia. Seven teams from the AFF participated in the inaugural event, plus a team fielded by sponsors, Federal Land Development Authority.

Participants

 (hosts)

 Federal Land Development Authority

Group stage

Group A

Group B

Knockout stage

Semi-finals

Third-place

Final

Goalscorers 
15 goals
  Bùi Trần Tuấn Anh

7 goals
  Phithack Kongmatilath

5 goals

  Made Antha Wijaya
  Chan Oo
  Mohd Zaharim Mohd Yusof
  Mohamad Norazaman Jaafar
  Tran Vinh Phuong
  Tanandon Praracha
  Vitoon Tapinna
  Komkrit Nanan

4 goals
  Made Agus Dwipayana
  Aung Soe Moe
  Chiu Nonmany

3 goals
  Mohd Riduwan Mohd Nor

2 goals

  Wayan Metra Jaya
  Dewa Kadek Dwipayudha
  Wayan Arsa Bagia
  Tona Bounmalay
  Khounsombath Phommaxay
  Mohd Jamil Daud
  Mohd Khairil Nizam Mohamad
  Mohd Hasrol Bin Ali
  Khairul Azizi Bin Norwawi
  Mohd Fakhrullah Mohamad
  Piyapong Songpiew
  Tu Nyein
  Mohamad Nor Saifuruddin Bin Ngah (FELDA)
  Amirul Asyraf Bin Abu Talib (FELDA)
  Huynh Ngoc Cuong

1 goal

  Agung Teguh Seri Rejeki
  Komang Kariana Antara
  Alias Bin Halib
  Ahmad Azrul Ahmad Rushidi (FELDA)
  Muhammad Azmi Hamzah (FELDA)
  Mohd Arif Mohd Zahri (FELDA)
  Pongsak Khongkaew
  Chattana
  Le Ngoc Cuong
  Le Kim Tuan
  Tran Van Hoa
  Huynh Ngoc Tien
  Tran Vinh Phong
  Phayvanh Louanglath
  Tu Mouakong Thao
  Khitsakhone Champathong
  Thinnakone Vongsa
  Ali Mahmoud Ramos
  Simpron Saludres
  Madayag Maverick
  Rodolfo Vicente Del Rosario
  Salem Attar
  Jhonar Almento
  Pyae Phyo Aung
  Htin Kyaw Aung
  Wai Phyo

References

External links
 Official website

AFF Beach Soccer Championship
International association football competitions hosted by Malaysia
Beach
AFF Beach Soccer Championship
AFF Beach Soccer Championship
AFF Beach Soccer Championship